XPlay is a drag and drop application created by Mediafour. This third party program allows for easier access of digital music on an iPod and is not supported by Apple.  It is notable for allowing Windows computers to use Mac formatted iPods.

A preview version was released in December 2001, with the first official release on June 24, 2002.

The most recent version of the software, released in 2008, with its final update (Version 3.5.1) having been released in April 2010, is XPlay 3, which could be purchased for $29.95, though it is no longer available.  This version integrates an iPod with the Windows operating system, allowing for the iPod to be managed using Windows Media Player, Windows Media Center, iTunes, or XPlay. It also allows the user to drag music, image, and video files from a disk directly onto the iPod.

See also
 Comparison of iPod Managers

References

External links
 Official page

IPod software